Phoma sclerotioides is a plant pathogen and is the culprit for brown root rot disease in, for instance, alfalfa and clover.

References

External links 
Index Fungorum
USDA ARS Fungal Database

Fungal plant pathogens and diseases
sclerotioides
Fungi described in 1892